Thomas John may refer to:
 Tommy John (born 1943), American professional baseball pitcher
 Tom John (born 1995), Welsh footballer
 Thomas John (medium), a psychic medium

See also 
 Tommy Johns (1851–1927), outfielder